The Miracle Maker may refer to:

 The Miracle Maker (1922 film), Soviet film
 The Miracle Maker (1999 film), animated film
 The Miracle Makers, a 1923 American silent film